The following highways are numbered 771:

United States
 Florida
  Florida State Road 771 (former)
  County Road 771 (Lee County, Florida)
  County Road 771 (Sarasota County, Florida)
 Georgia State Route 771 (former)
  Ohio State Route 771
  Puerto Rico Highway 771